Oxford Airport was an airfield operational in from 1966 to before 2005 in Oxford, Massachusetts.

References

Oxford, Massachusetts
Defunct airports in Massachusetts
Airports in Worcester County, Massachusetts